Jacob "Jaap" Kraaier (November 28, 1913 – January 7, 2004) was a Dutch flatwater canoeist who competed in the 1930s. At the 1936 Summer Olympics in Berlin, he won the bronze medal in K-1 1000 m event. Following his career in sports, Kraaier established himself as a businessman and naval architect. One of his most famous designs is the Pirate dinghy (Dutch: "Piraatje") for children, thousands of which have been built since its inception in the 1950s. Kraaier was born in Zaandam and died in Egmond aan Zee.

References
DatabaseOlympics.com profile
Sports-reference.com profile

1913 births
2004 deaths
Dutch male canoeists
Olympic canoeists of the Netherlands
Canoeists at the 1936 Summer Olympics
Medalists at the 1936 Summer Olympics
Olympic bronze medalists for the Netherlands
Olympic medalists in canoeing
Sportspeople from Zaanstad
20th-century Dutch people
21st-century Dutch people